Hanahikari Setsuo (born 21 June 1940 as Setsuo Endo) is a former sumo wrestler from Matsuo, Iwate, Japan. He made his professional debut in May 1958 and reached the top division in November 1965. His highest rank was maegashira 3. Upon retirement from active competition he became an elder in the Japan Sumo Association under the name Ōtake. He left the Sumo Association in May 1975.

Career record

See also
Glossary of sumo terms
List of past sumo wrestlers
List of sumo tournament second division champions

References

1940 births
Living people
Japanese sumo wrestlers
Sumo people from Iwate Prefecture